Judit Pogány (born 10 September 1944) is a Hungarian actress. She has appeared in more than seventy films since 1974.

Selected filmography

References

External links 

1944 births
Living people
Hungarian film actresses
People from Kaposvár